Grinava (Hungarian: Grinád, German: Grünau) is a historical village in Slovakia, since 1 July 1975 a suburb of the town of Pezinok. It contains a listed 14th-century church originally built by Saxon colonists. During the Second World War a prison camp for American POWs was located in the village. Towards the end of the Second World War there was fighting in and around Grinava between German and Soviet forces.

Under the Czechoslovak Republic (1948-1990) the village was renamed Myslenice. It has since reverted to its earlier name.

References 

Villages and municipalities in Pezinok District
Villages in Slovakia merged with towns